Holy Cross Home Science College, is a women's general degree college located in Tuticorin, Thoothukudi district, Tamil Nadu. It was established in the year 1975. The college is affiliated with Manonmaniam Sundaranar University. This college offers different courses in arts, commerce and science.

Departments

Science
Computer Science
Food Science and Nutrition
Home Science
Fashion Designing and Apparel Making

Arts and Commerce
Tamil
English
Commerce

Accreditation
The college is  recognized by the University Grants Commission (UGC).

References

External links
http://hchsc.com/index.php

Educational institutions established in 1975
1975 establishments in Tamil Nadu
Colleges affiliated to Manonmaniam Sundaranar University
Universities and colleges in Thoothukudi district